Rommen is a Norwegian Oslo Metro station on Grorud Line between Romsås and Stovner, 13 km from Stortinget. It is located immediately east of the entrance to the tunnel which runs under the Romsås hill. The station was opened 13 March 1974 and was the end stop for the Grorud Line until it was extended to Stovner on 18 August the same year.

Rommen is located in a fairly industrial area, near industries such as the brush manufacturer Jordan AS. Also near the station is Grorud Fire Station.

References

External links

Eastern T-bane stations

Oslo Metro stations in Oslo
Railway stations opened in 1974
1974 establishments in Norway